The Journal for Peace and Justice Studies is a biannual peer-reviewed academic journal published by the Center for Peace & Justice Education (Villanova University). It covers issues of social justice and peace, informed by the Catholic social tradition. The journal was established in 1988. All issues are available online from the Philosophy Documentation Center.

See also 
 List of philosophy journals
 List of political science journals

External links
 
 Center for Peace and Justice Education

Biannual journals
English-language journals
Philosophy journals
Political science journals
Publications established in 1988
Villanova University
Philosophy Documentation Center academic journals